A bathtub, also known simply as a bath or tub, is a container for holding water in which a person or animal may bathe. Most modern bathtubs are made of thermoformed acrylic, porcelain-enameled steel or cast iron, or fiberglass-reinforced polyester. A bathtub is placed in a bathroom, either as a stand-alone fixture or in conjunction with a shower.

Modern bathtubs have overflow and waste drains and may have taps mounted on them.  They are usually built-in, but may be free-standing or sometimes sunken. Until acrylic thermoforming technology permitted other shapes, virtually all bathtubs used to be roughly rectangular. Bathtubs are commonly white in color, although many other colors can be found. 

Two main styles are common:
 Western style bathtubs in which the bather lies down. These baths are typically shallow and long.
 Eastern style bathtubs in which the bather sits up. These are known as furo in Japan and are typically short and deep.

History of bathtubs and bathing 

Documented early plumbing systems for bathing go back as far as around 3300 BC with the discovery of copper water pipes beneath a palace in ancient Europe.

The clawfoot tub, which reached the apex of its popularity in the late 19th century, had its origins in the mid 18th century, when the ball and claw design originated in the Netherlands, possibly artistically inspired by the Chinese motif of a dragon holding a precious stone. The design spread to England, where it found much popularity among the aristocracy, just as bathing was becoming increasingly fashionable. Early bathtubs in England tended to be made of cast iron, or even tin and copper with a face of paint applied that tended to peel with time.

The Scottish-born inventor David Buick invented a process for bonding porcelain enamel to cast iron in the 1880s while working for the Alexander Manufacturing Company in Detroit. The company, as well as others including Kohler Company and J. L. Mott Iron Works, began successfully marketing porcelain enameled cast-iron bathtubs, a process that remains broadly the same to this day. Far from the ornate feet and luxury most associated with clawfoot tubs, an early Kohler example was advertised as a "horse trough/hog scalder, when furnished with four legs will serve as a bathtub."  The item's use as a hog scalder was considered a more important marketing point than its ability to function as a bathtub.

In the latter half of the 20th century, the once popular clawfoot tub morphed into a built-in tub with a small apron front. This enclosed style afforded easier maintenance and, with the emergence of colored sanitary ware, more design options for the homeowner. The Crane Company introduced colored bathroom fixtures to the United States market in 1928, and slowly this influx of design options and easier cleaning and care led to the near demise of clawfoot-style tubs.

In the 1960s fiberglass bathtubs became the standard for homes, being lightweight and inexpensive.

James R. Wheeler and his brother Richard in 1979 adapted the acrylic being used for outdoor spas to make acrylic bathtubs. Working with Spartech Plastics, they developed the modern co-extruded and durable acrylic bathtub. The company American Bath Factory was the first to expand the diversity of acrylic bathtubs to include whirlpools, clawfoot bathtubs, and a large variety of pedestal and modern bathtubs.

The process for enamelling cast iron bathtubs was invented by the Scottish-born American David Dunbar Buick.

Types

Clawfoot tub 
The clawfoot tub was considered a luxury item in the late 19th century, originally made from cast iron and lined with porcelain. Modern technology has contributed to a drop in the price of clawfoot tubs, which may now be made of fiberglass, acrylic or other modern materials. Clawfoot tubs usually require more water than a standard bathtub, because generally they are larger.  While true antique clawfoot tubs are still considered collectible items, new reproduction clawfoot tubs are chosen by remodelers and new home builders and much like the Western-style bathtubs, clawfoot tubs can also include a variety of shower head options.

Clawfoot tubs come in four major styles:
 Classic roll rim tubs, also called roll top tubs or flat rim tubs as seen in the picture at the top of this page.
 Slipper tubs – where one end is raised and sloped creating a more comfortable lounging position.
 Double slipper tubs – where both ends are raised and sloped.
 Double ended tubs – where both ends of the tub are rounded, as opposed to the classic roll rim tub, which has one rounded end and one fairly flat end.

Pedestal tubs 
Pedestal tubs rest on a pedestal in what many would term an art deco style. Evidence of pedestal tubs dates back to the island of Crete around 1000 BC.

Baby bathtub 
A baby bathtub is one used for bathing infants, especially those not yet old enough to sit up on their own. These can be either a small, stand-alone bath that is filled with water from another source, or a device for supporting the baby that is placed in a standard bathtub. Many are designed to allow the baby to recline while keeping its head out of the water.

Hot tubs 

Hot tubs are common heated pools used for relaxation and sometimes for therapy. Hot tubs became popularized in the U.S. during the early hippie era (1967–1980), appearing in films and music.

Whirlpool tubs 
Whirlpool tubs first became popular in the U.S. during the 1960s and 1970s. A spa or hot tub is also called a "jacuzzi" since the word became a generic after plumbing component manufacturer Jacuzzi introduced the "Spa Whirlpool" in 1968. Air bubbles may be introduced into the nozzles via an air-bleed venturi pump.

Freestand bathtubs 
Freestanding tubs have become popular in recent years as a result of larger bathrooms being constructed. Freestanding bathtubs may be made from various materials such as stone resin, cast stone, acrylic, cast iron, fiberglass, porcelain, copper, and cement.

Soft bathtubs 
Soft tubs are made from soft plastic or foam with a protective non-slip coating. While soft tubs have been available since the 1970s, by the 1990s they were being sold by major manufacturers. The tubs are typically marketed for children and the elderly, to prevent injury from falls.

See also

References 

Tub
Babycare
Plumbing
Tub